100% Hits: The Very Best of 2002 is a 2002 compilation album released by EMI Music Australia and Warner Music Australia.  The album was the #19 compilation album on the 2003 year-end charts in Australia. The album was certified platinum in Australia.

Track listing
Kylie Minogue – "In Your Eyes" (3:18)
Disco Montego featuring Katie Underwood – "Beautiful" (3:42)
Paul Mac featuring Peta Morris – "The Sound of Breaking Up" (3:18)
Moby – "We Are All Made of Stars" (3:36)
Silverchair – "Without You" (4:17)
Coldplay – "In My Place" (3:49)
Alex Lloyd – "Green" (4:05)
Kasey Chambers – "Not Pretty Enough" (3:21)
Taxiride – "Creepin' Up Slowly" (3:58)
Michelle Branch – "Everywhere" (3:38)
Atomic Kitten – "It's OK!" (3:18)
Blue – "If You Come Back" (3:26)
Fat Joe featuring Ashanti – "What's Luv?" (3:52)
NSYNC – "Girlfriend" (4:16)
Daniel Bedingfield – "Gotta Get Thru This" (2:44)
iiO – "Rapture" (3:13)
Riva featuring Dannii Minogue – "Who Do You Love Now?" (3:27)
Britney Spears – "I'm Not a Girl, Not Yet a Woman" (3:52)
Robbie Williams and Nicole Kidman – "Somethin' Stupid" (2:48)
The Whitlams – "Fall for You" (3:46)
Motor Ace – "Carry On" (4:45)
P.O.D. – "Alive" (3:24)

References

External links
 100% Hits: Very Best Of 2002

2002 compilation albums
EMI Records compilation albums
2002 in Australian music